Suck Creek may refer to:

Suck Creek, Tennessee, an unincorporated community in Marion County
Suck Creek, West Virginia, an unincorporated community in Summers County